Portage la Prairie Airport may refer to:

 Canadian Forces Base Portage la Prairie
 Portage la Prairie/Southport Airport
 Portage la Prairie (North) Airport, a small public airport

See also
 Portage la Prairie (disambiguation)